Colony High School is a high school located in Ontario, California and is part of the Chaffey Joint Union High School District. The school serves the communities of southern Ontario, including the new Ontario Ranch community, and portions of eastern Rancho Cucamonga and southeast Fontana. The school earned the 2018 Civic Learning Award for the State of California  and was a 2018 Silver Medal winner for the U.S. News & World Report ranking of Best High Schools. Over 60 percent of the Colony High School Class of 2017 met the University of California A-G requirement rate, nearly 14 percent above the state average.

History
When Colony High School opened in 2002, its first students and faculty were transfers from around the Chaffey Joint Union High School District.

Jim Brodie was the school's first principal. Michelle Boyette replaced Brodie in 2007 and remained the principal until 2011 when was transferred to an assistant principal position at Montclair High School. Kern Oduro, the then-principal of Rancho Cucamonga High School, replaced Boyette.

The Class of 2005, better known as "The Titan Legacy," completed the first year of their coursework at Colony's feeder high schools and was the first graduating class. The Class of 2006 was the first set of graduates to complete all four years of coursework at Colony High School and are nicknamed "The Original Titans."

Campus
The Colony High Library, a branch of the Ontario City Library, is found on campus. The branch location is used as a polling place during elections.

Academics
Colony High School follows a standard California high school curriculum as defined by the California Department of Education's High School Graduation Requirements and tests students with the Standardized Testing and Reporting (STAR) program and the California High School Exit Exam.

Colony High School offers students opportunities to earn college credit through College Board Advanced Placement (AP) and dual-credit courses.  Dual-credit courses, are taken at Chaffey College in Rancho Cucamonga during the summer session and, if passed, qualify as credit for both high school graduation and college classes.  In addition, Colony High School has the Gifted and Talented Education (GATE) program, honors classes, and participates in the nationwide Renaissance program.

The Class of 2006 recorded the highest pass rate for any AP test, receiving a 95% pass rate for the AP Calculus test under the instruction of Christopher W. Chang.

Arts
Colony High School has a wide array of classes and clubs revolving around the arts: Art, Ceramics, Music Appreciation, Digital Media, Drama & Theatre, Choir, Dance, Marching Band, Jazz Band, Percussion, and Color Guard classes.

Choir and orchestra

Michael Bachman has been the director of these two programs since the school opened.

Band, percussion, and color guard

The Colony High School Titan Regiment consists of a band, percussion, and color guard. They compete in the California State Band Championships (CSBC) and the Southern California School Band and Orchestra Association (SCSBOA) circuits and host annual field tournaments. Prior to the 2008-2009 school year, the director was Jason Alvo. He was replaced by Graig Withrow, who was replaced by James Rocillo. Rocillo left the program in 2016 to pursue band director for the RCC Marching Tigers. Jered Sherrill was the director for one school year (2016-2017). Matthew Matthews is the current band director.

Championship qualification years:

2004: 7th place (3A)

2006: 4th place (3A)

2007: 9th place (3A)

2008: 10th place (3A)

2009: 5th place (3A)

2010: 10th place (2A)

2011: 1st place (2A)

2012: 2nd place (3A)

2013: 4th place (3A)

2014: 2nd place (3A)

2015: 2nd place (3A)

2016: 7th place (3A)

2018: 10th place (3A)

2019: 12th place (3A SCSBOA); 5th place (5A CSBC); 10th place (5A CSBC State Finalists)

2020: No season due to COVID-19 pandemic

2021: 2nd place (3A CSBC); 2nd place (Open Class State Finals for 1A/2A/3A) 

2022: 1st place (3A CSBC); 1st place (Open Class State Finals for 1A/2A/3A) State Champions

Theatre
The Colony Theatre Arts Department performs at the 1,263 seat Colony High School Performing Arts Theatre. Among their past productions are Dracula, Grease, Black Comedy, Metamorphoses, Noises Off, West Side Story, You Can't Take It with You, Taming of the Shrew, A Christmas Carol, Lend Me A Tenor, Once on this Island, Leading Ladies, The Diviners, Tartuffe, The Elephant Man (play), Blithe Spirit (play) and a variety show titled 30/60 (which features a cast of seven performing thirty original skits in sixty minutes, hence the name 30/60). They have also performed other theatrical shows, such as Hairspray, A Dinner With Zombies (which made its theatrical debut at Colony High School) and Sophocles' Antigone. The department has competed in the Drama Teacher Association of Southern California's (DTASC) acting and tech competition, and the California Educational Theatre Association's CETA event.

All theatre classes and productions were taught and directed by Arik Boles, a Cal Poly Pomona graduate and theatre major. Boles began teaching at Colony in 2004 and obtained his master's degree in theatre arts in 2007, after directing "You Can't Take It With You" as his thesis production. Classes and productions are now taught and directed by Jesse Cash, a former stand up comedian.

Culture

Demographics
As "Home of the Titans" the school enrolls approximately 2,500 low to middle income students between grades 9 through 12.

Sports
Colony High School's sports program includes baseball, basketball, cheer, cross country, football, golf, swimming, soccer, tennis, track, volleyball, water polo, softball, and wrestling, and cross country running.

Football
Derrick Smith also of the class of 2006 and a running back on the football team won the 2005 CIF-SS Masters Meet champion in the long jump. Several athletes in the class of 2006 set the foundation for the future success of Colony Athletics.

On Friday, December 8, 2006, the Colony High School football team won the CIF-Southern Section Central Division championship game against Wildomar Elsinore by finishing an 80-yard drive with a touchdown run by quarterback Jeff Ginolfi for a 16-to-13 final score. The Daily Bulletin, a local newspaper, stated, "For as long as Colony High School exists, they will always remember 'The Drive.'"

The Titans went on to win the Central Division Championship again in 2007.

Soccer
The Titan Soccer team 2004-2005 led by the Paez brothers were Champions of the Mt Baldy league 2004-2005 coach Frank Green received the title unfortunately he left Colony after.

In the graduating class of 2007 there were several D-1 athletes, including Omar Bolden (Arizona State University), Bobby Wagner (Utah State University), Chris Givens (Boise State University), Maurice Shaw (University of Idaho) Ryan Paez (University of San Diego).

Water polo
The Girls Water Polo team was undefeated Mt. Baldy League Champions in 2005, 2006, and 2007.

Tennis
The 2007-08 Boys Tennis Team ranked #1 and went 14-1 in the Mt. Baldy League and made history being the first boys league champs at Colony High School. Led by captains Beto and David Quinones, they went to CIF for the first time in school history against first round matchup Hemet High School with a victory of 12-6. Next they faced top ranked Viewpoint (Calabasas, CA) and lost 15-3.

The Girls Tennis team while being undefeated Mt. Baldy League Champions in the 2008 season (15-0). In 2009, they also won League Title with only one loss all season. Their number one singles, Lauren Remington was number one in League as were number one doubles players, Jocelyn Mireles and Tasnuva Islam.

Notable faculty and alumni
NFL players Bobby Wagner, Josh Andrews, Omar Bolden and Jared Bell are Colony High School Alumni.

References

External links
Colony High School, maintained by the Chaffey Joint Union High School District
Chaffey Joint Union High School District
Ontario City Library

High schools in San Bernardino County, California
Public high schools in California
2002 establishments in California
Educational institutions established in 2002